is a Japanese professional footballer who plays as a winger for Indonesian club Persebaya Surabaya.

Career
Born in Kasukabe, Yamamoto debuted professionally already abroad in Europe with Rudar Pljevlja in the 2016–17 Montenegrin First League. He will play the following two seasons with another Montenegrin top-flight side, Petrovac. His successful adaptation to football in former-Yugoslavia made him come up on the radars of other teams from the region, which resulted in his move in summer 2019 to Serbian side Spartak Subotica.

He scored the winning goal against Arema in Liga 1 match, which saw the Persebaya Surabaya defeats Arema in 2-3 in away game, ending the 23 years of winless streak against the Malang-based team. The post-match however were overshadowed by a riot and stampede.

Career statistics

Club

Notes

References

Living people
1996 births
Sportspeople from Tokyo Metropolis
Association football people from Tokyo Metropolis
Japanese footballers
Japanese expatriate footballers
Association football forwards
Montenegrin First League players
Serbian SuperLiga players
Liga 1 (Indonesia) players
FK Rudar Pljevlja players
OFK Petrovac players
FK Spartak Subotica players
FK Iskra Danilovgrad players
Persebaya Surabaya players
Japanese expatriate sportspeople in Montenegro
Expatriate footballers in Montenegro
Japanese expatriate sportspeople in Serbia
Expatriate footballers in Serbia
Japanese expatriate sportspeople in Indonesia
Expatriate footballers in Indonesia